United States gubernatorial elections were held in 1934, in 34 states, concurrent with the House and Senate elections, on November 6, 1934 (September 10 in Maine).

Results

See also 
1934 United States elections
1934 United States Senate elections
1934 United States House of Representatives elections

References

Notes 

 
November 1934 events